Ariel Thierry Ngueukam (born 15 November 1988) is a Cameroonian professional footballer who plays as a striker for Finnish club Ilves.

Career
Born in Yaoundé, Ngueukam began playing football as a striker with local sides FC Achille de Sa'a and FC Lotus-Terek. After unsuccessful trials with clubs in Hungary and Bulgaria, he signed with Finnish second division club JIPPO, where he would score 13 goals in his first 11 matches.

In 2012, he moved to FC Lahti in the Finnish first division. Ngueukam scored two goals on his debut for FC Lahti on 31 August 2012. Ngueukam signed for Turkish club Denizlispor in January 2013, but returned FC Lahti, playing with them in the 2013 and 2014 seasons. He moved to SJK for the 2015 season, and Ilves for the 2017 season.

On 6 November 2017, Ngueukam signed a two-year contract with HJK Helsinki for the 2018 and 2019 seasons. In January 2018 Ngueukam joined Al-Khor in Qatar, without having played for HJK.

On 11 July 2018 Ngueukam signed to the Israeli Premier League club Hapoel Ra'anana.

In June 2019 he returned to Finland to sign for KuPS. In November 2019 it was announced that he would return to SJK for the 2020 season.

On 17 March 2022, Ngueukam returned to Ilves for the 2022 season, with an option to extend for 2023.

Career statistics

References

1988 births
Living people
Cameroonian footballers
JIPPO players
FC Lahti players
Denizlispor footballers
Seinäjoen Jalkapallokerho players
FC Ilves players
Al-Khor SC players
Hapoel Ra'anana A.F.C. players
Kuopion Palloseura players
Ykkönen players
Veikkausliiga players
TFF First League players
Qatar Stars League players
Israeli Premier League players
Association football forwards
Cameroonian expatriate footballers
Cameroonian expatriate sportspeople in Finland
Cameroonian expatriate sportspeople in Turkey
Cameroonian expatriate sportspeople in Qatar
Cameroonian expatriate sportspeople in Israel
Expatriate footballers in Finland
Expatriate footballers in Turkey
Expatriate footballers in Qatar
Expatriate footballers in Israel
Footballers from Yaoundé